Pedro Henrique Dias de Amorim (born 23 September 1992), simply known as Pedro Dias or Pedrão, is a Brazilian footballer  who plays as a centre back for Tanjong Pagar United.

Club career

Nakhon Pathom United
Pedro signed for the Thailand side after playing in South Africa.

Sarawak
On 25 January 2019, Pedrão signed a contract with Malaysia Premier League side, from Nakhon Pathom United F.C.

Tanjong Pagar United
Pedro signed for Tanjong Pagar United for the 2023 season after a successful referral by his agent.

Career statistics

Club

References

External links

1992 births
Living people
People from Manaus
Brazilian footballers
Brazilian expatriate footballers
Association football defenders
Expatriate footballers in Malaysia
Sarawak FA players
Sportspeople from Amazonas (Brazilian state)